George Cochran Lambdin (1830–1896) was an American Victorian artist, best known for his paintings of flowers.

Biography
The son of portrait painter James Lambdin, he was born on January 6, 1830, in Pittsburgh, Pennsylvania. He studied at the Pennsylvania Academy of the Fine Arts in Philadelphia, and exhibited there beginning in 1848. During the American Civil War, he worked with the United States Sanitary Commission, distributing medicines and bandages to troops in the field. He painted genre scenes of camp life, and domestic scenes that often included soldiers.

He was in poor health, beginning in middle age, and settled in the Germantown section of Philadelphia. There, he concentrated on painting flowers, especially roses, for the last 25 years of his life. Many of these paintings were copied as chromolithographs and mass-produced.

He was elected to the National Academy of Design in 1868, and was an academician of the Pennsylvania Academy of the Fine Arts. He died in Germantown on January 28, 1896.

Gallery

References

External links
 Artwork By George Cochran Lambdin
 Artwork by George C. Lambdin
 The Lambdins of Philadelphia

1830 births
1896 deaths
Artists from Pittsburgh
Pennsylvania Academy of the Fine Arts alumni
Artists from Philadelphia
People of Pennsylvania in the American Civil War
19th-century American painters
19th-century American male artists
Painters from Pennsylvania
American male painters